Acción por Movistar Plus+ (formerly Movistar Acción) is a Spanish television station owned and operated by Telefónica.

External links
Official site

Movistar+
Television stations in Spain
Television channels and stations established in 2003
2003 establishments in Spain